Bathu temples (बाथू मंदिर), known locally as Bathu ki ladi (बाथू की लड़ी), is a cluster of temples in the Kangra district of Indian state of Himachal Pradesh, with the main temple dedicated to goddess Parvati and Lord Shiva. These temples were submerged in Maharana Pratap Sagar, a reservoir created by Pong dam in the early 1970s. Since then, these temples are only accessible from May to June when the water level decreases.
The temples are accessible by boat from Dhameta and Nagrota Surian and accessible by road from Jawali. 
There are several small villages near the temple site, which includes Guglara, Sugnara, Harsar, Jarot, Bajera, Katnor, Khabal, Ludret, and Bhial.

History 
According to common local belief, it was built by local king who ruled the region. Many stories about the origin of the temples are famous among the folklore.  Other beliefs say that temple was built by Pandavas. The folklore tells a story dating back to Mahabharata when Pandavas attempted to build a staircase to ascend to Heaven at monolithic Masrur Rock Temples located at the opposite of the lake but Indira intervened. But, successfully built the 'Stairway to Heaven' at 'Bathu ki Ladi' temples where that staircase still exists even today and one can climb to the top most part to have a feel. The central temple is dedicated to Lord Shiva. Submerged 'Bathu ki Ladi' temples can be visited in winters when water recedes.

Gallery

Rehabilitation 
Shivling was restored under the supervision of Honourable Manoj Kumar, the State coordinator of Vishwa Hindu Parishad in this ancient temple series.

Other things 
 It is an abode of migratory birds which attracts many birdwatchers and tourists. Some of the birds are extensively found here.
 It was a shooting location for many Punjabi music videos, including those of Miss Pooja and Kaler Kanth.
 It was featured on Pepsi MTV Indies' Show Way Back Home Episode 4.

References

Buildings and structures in Kangra district
Hindu temples in Himachal Pradesh